Starosultangulovo (İśke Soltanğol) is a rural locality (a village) in Staroyanbayevsky Selsoviet, Baltachevsky District, Bashkortostan, Russia. The population was 25 as of 2010. There is 1 street.

Geography 
Starosultangulovo is located 25 km southeast of Starobaltachevo (the district's administrative centre) by road. Chukaly is the nearest rural locality.

References 

Rural localities in Baltachevsky District